Rémy Boissier (born 22 February 1994) is a French professional footballer who plays as a midfielder for Rodez.

Life and career
Boissier was born in Millau in 1994. He joined Rodez as a 16-year-old, and went on to make 76 appearances in the fourth-tier Championnat de France Amateur and a further 26 in the Championnat National. He was named in the 2017–18 Team of the Year at the Championnat National awards ceremony. After six senior seasons, he left Rodez, not "for the sake of it, nor for the money" but to further his development as a player.

He signed for another National team, Le Mans, helped them gain promotion to Ligue 2 in his first seasonnot least by scoring in each leg of the play-offsand was again named in the Team of the Year. He made his Ligue 2 debut in the starting eleven for Le Mans' opening fixture of the 2019–20 season, and played regularly for a time, but gradually lost his place in the face of significant competition in midfield, and in January 2020, returned to Rodez on loan to the end of the campaign.

References

1994 births
Living people
People from Millau
French footballers
Association football midfielders
Rodez AF players
Le Mans FC players
Championnat National 2 players
Championnat National players
Ligue 2 players
Sportspeople from Aveyron
Footballers from Occitania (administrative region)